Nitai, Nittai, or Nitay may refer to:

People

 Nityananda (born circa 1474), a Hindu religious figure, also referred to as Nitai
 Nittai of Arbela, a Jewish jurist of the Second Temple period
 Nitai Roy Chowdhury, a Bangladeshi lawyer and politician
 Nitai Hershkovits (born 1988), an Israeli jazz musician
 Nityananda (Nitai) Palit (1923–1990), an Indian playwright, actor and director

Benzion Netanyahu (Israeli historian, 1910–2012) and Benjamin Netanyahu (born 1949, current Israeli prime minister) have also gone under the name Nitai.

Other
 Mount Nitai, a mountain in Israel

See also
 Nityananda (disambiguation)